Ultracold atoms are atoms that are maintained at temperatures close to 0 kelvin (absolute zero), typically below several tens of microkelvin (µK). At these temperatures the atom's quantum-mechanical properties become important.

To reach such low temperatures, a combination of several techniques typically has to be used. First, atoms are usually trapped and pre-cooled via laser cooling in a magneto-optical trap. To reach the lowest possible temperature, further cooling is performed using evaporative cooling in a magnetic or optical trap. Several Nobel prizes in physics are related to the development of the techniques to manipulate quantum properties of individual atoms (e.g. 1995-1997, 2001, 2005, 2012, 2017).

Experiments with ultracold atoms study a variety of phenomena, including quantum phase transitions, Bose–Einstein condensation (BEC), bosonic superfluidity, quantum magnetism, many-body spin dynamics, Efimov states, Bardeen–Cooper–Schrieffer (BCS) superfluidity and the BEC–BCS crossover. Some of these research directions utilize ultracold atom systems as quantum simulators to study the physics of other systems, including the unitary Fermi gas and the Ising and Hubbard models. Ultracold atoms could also be used for realization of quantum computers.

History
Samples of ultracold atoms are typically prepared through the interactions of a dilute gas with a laser field. Evidence for radiation pressure, force due to light on atoms, was demonstrated independently by Lebedev, and Nichols and Hull in 1901. In 1933, Otto Frisch demonstrated the deflection of individual sodium particles by light generated from a sodium lamp.

The invention of the laser spurred the development of additional techniques to manipulate atoms with light. Using laser light to cool atoms was first proposed in 1975 by taking advantage of the Doppler effect to make the radiation force on an atom dependent on its velocity, a technique known as Doppler cooling. Similar ideas were also proposed to cool samples of trapped ions. Applying Doppler cooling in three dimensions will slow atoms to velocities that are typically a few cm/s and produce what is known as an optical molasses.

Typically, the source of neutral atoms for these experiments were thermal ovens which produced atoms at temperatures of a few hundred kelvins. The atoms from these oven sources are moving at hundred of meters per second.  One of the major technical challenges in Doppler cooling was increasing the amount of time an atom can interact with the laser light. This challenge was overcome by the introduction of a Zeeman Slower. A Zeeman Slower uses a spatially varying magnetic field to maintain the relative energy spacing of the atomic transitions involved in Doppler cooling. This increases the amount of time the atom spends interacting with the laser light.

The development of the first magneto-optical trap (MOT) by Raab et al. in 1987 was an important step towards the creation of samples of ultracold atoms. Typical temperatures achieved with a MOT are tens to hundreds of microkelvins. In essence, a magneto optical trap confines atoms in space by applying a magnetic field so that lasers not only provide a velocity dependent force but also a spatially varying force. The 1997 Nobel prize in physics was awarded for development of methods to cool and trap atoms with laser light and was shared by Steven Chu, Claude Cohen-Tannoudji and William D. Phillips.

Evaporative cooling was used in experimental efforts to reach lower temperatures in an effort to discover a new state of matter predicted by Satyendra Nath Bose and Albert Einstein known as a Bose–Einstein condensate (BEC). In evaporative cooling, the hottest atoms in a sample are allowed to escape  which reduces the average temperature of the sample. The Nobel Prize in 2001 was awarded to  Eric A. Cornell, Wolfgang Ketterle and Carl E. Wieman for the achievement of Bose–Einstein condensate in dilute gases of alkali atoms, and for early fundamental studies of the properties of the condensates.

Applications
Ultracold atoms have a variety of applications owing to their unique quantum properties and the great experimental control available in such systems. For instance, ultracold atoms have been proposed as a platform for quantum computation and quantum simulation, accompanied by very active experimental research to achieve these goals.

Quantum simulation is of great interest in the context of condensed matter physics, where it may provide valuable insights into the properties of interacting quantum systems. The ultracold atoms are used to implement an analogue of the condensed matter system of interest, which can then be explored using the tools available in the particular implementation. Since these tools may differ greatly from those available in the actual condensed matter system, one can thus experimentally probe otherwise inaccessible quantities. Furthermore, ultracold atoms may even allow to create exotic states of matter, which cannot otherwise be observed in nature.

Ultracold atoms are also used in experiments for precision measurements enabled by the low thermal noise and, in some cases, by exploiting quantum mechanics to exceed the standard quantum limit. In addition to potential technical applications, such precision measurements may serve as tests of our current understanding of physics.

See also
 Bose–Einstein condensate
 Cold Atom Laboratory
 Quantum simulator

References

Sources

Quantum mechanics
Thermodynamics
Atomic physics

he:אטומים קרים